Meniscofemoral ligament can refer to:
 Anterior meniscofemoral ligament
 Posterior meniscofemoral ligament